Fannia lustrator is a fly species in the Fanniidae family. This species is smaller and more slender than the house fly, Musca domestica, and is similar in appearance to the lesser house fly, Fannia canicularis. It is found in the  Palearctic.

References

External links
 

Fanniidae
Insects described in 1780
Muscomorph flies of Europe